Esko Ranta (born 14 January 1947) is a Finnish footballer. He played in 63 matches for the Finland national football team from 1969 to 1980.

References

External links
 

1947 births
Living people
Finnish footballers
Finland international footballers
Place of birth missing (living people)
Association footballers not categorized by position